The 1836 Ohio gubernatorial election was held on October 11, 1836.

Incumbent Democratic Governor Robert Lucas did not run for re-election.

Whig nominee Joseph Vance defeated Democratic nominee Eli Baldwin with 51.64% of the vote.

General election

Candidates
Eli Baldwin, Democratic, farmer, former State Senator, former judge of the Court of Common Pleas for Trumbull County
Joseph Vance, Whig, former U.S. Representative

Results

Notes

References

1836
Ohio
Gubernatorial